Irina Buryachok (born 5 July 1986) is a former tennis player from Ukraine.

On 14 June 2010, she reached a career-high singles ranking of world No. 183, and on 17 March 2014, she peaked at No. 66 in the doubles rankings.

In 2012, she won her first WTA Tour title in Baku, partnering Valeria Solovieva, and she reached a WTA final in Shenzhen, China in 2013.

She lives and trains in Italy.

WTA career finals

Doubles: 3 (2 titles, 1 runner-up)

WTA 125 tournament finals

Doubles: 1 (runner-up)

ITF Circuit finals

Singles: 10 (4–6)

Doubles: 31 (13–18)

References

External links
 
 

1986 births
Living people
Ukrainian female tennis players
Sportspeople from Kherson
21st-century Ukrainian women